Zaghlijeh (also Romanized as Zāghlījeh; also known as Zāghalījeh, Zāghaljeh, and Zāgh Līcheh) is a village in Pish Khowr Rural District, Pish Khowr District, Famenin County, Hamadan Province, Iran. At the 2006 census, its population was 95, in 28 families.

References 

Populated places in Famenin County